Trochiscanthes is a genus of flowering plants belonging to the family Apiaceae. It has only one species, Trochiscanthes nodiflora. Its native range is Central Europe.

Some sources spell the epithet nodiflorus. However, genus names ending in -anthes are treated as feminine.

References

Apioideae
Monotypic Apioideae genera